Peter O'Rourke may refer to:
 Peter O'Rourke (footballer)
 Peter O'Rourke (U.S. government official)